David "Dave" Ziegler (born September 7, 1977) is an American football executive who is general manager of the Las Vegas Raiders of the National Football League (NFL). Ziegler previously served in various roles for the New England Patriots eventually rising to the role of director of player personnel. Ziegler began his NFL career as a player personnel assistant with the Denver Broncos before serving in the scouting department for the Patriots from 2013 to 2021.

Early years
A native of Tallmadge, Ohio, Ziegler played college football at John Carroll University as a wide receiver, kick returner and punt returner. He was teammates with Houston Texans' general manager Nick Caserio, Las Vegas Raiders' head coach Josh McDaniels and New York Giants quarterbacks coach Jerry Schuplinski.

Executive career

Denver Broncos
In 2010, Ziegler began his career with the Denver Broncos as a player personnel assistant. In 2011, he was promoted to area scout and to pro scout in 2012.

New England Patriots
In 2013, Ziegler was hired by the New England Patriots as their assistant director of pro scouting, a position he held until 2015. In 2016, he was promoted to director of pro personnel. In 2020, Ziegler was promoted to assistant director of player personnel. In 2021, he was promoted to director of player personnel, replacing Nick Caserio following his departure to become the general manager of the Houston Texans.

Las Vegas Raiders
On January 30, 2022, Ziegler was named the general manager of the Las Vegas Raiders, replacing Mike Mayock.

Personal life
Ziegler and his wife, Carissa, have three children. They currently reside in Las Vegas, Nevada.

References

External links
 Las Vegas Raiders profile

1977 births
Living people
American football wide receivers
Denver Broncos scouts
John Carroll Blue Streaks football players
Las Vegas Raiders executives
National Football League general managers
New England Patriots executives
New England Patriots scouts
People from Tallmadge, Ohio